Damian Podleśny is a Polish football player who plays as a goalkeeper for Górnik Łęczna.

References

External links

Living people
1995 births
Polish footballers
Association football goalkeepers
Lechia Gdańsk players
Chojniczanka Chojnice players
Wigry Suwałki players
Ekstraklasa players
People from Lubartów
GKS Bełchatów players
Górnik Łęczna players